Princess Yongtai, born Li Xianhui; 685 – October 9, 701), courtesy name Nonghui (穠輝),  was a princess of the Tang Dynasty.

Biography
Li was the seventh daughter of Emperor Zhongzong of Tang and the second daughter of Empress Wei. She married Wu Yanji (武延基), Prince of Wei, a grandnephew of Wu Zetian.

Death
The cause of Li's death is widely disputed. One report states that Wu Zetian, who had deposed Zhongzong after a brief reign, heard of remarks that Li supposedly made and had her flogged to death, or alternatively she was made to hang herself. Her husband and elder brother were also executed. It was reported that Li, her husband and her brother were heard laughing over part of court life they found absurd. This was reported to the Empress who was paranoid and saw a threat to her position and reign everywhere. It was said that, knowing they were to be executed, Li, her husband and brother, saw suicide as the better option. She was originally written to have suffered a traitors death, though this was untrue and merely what the Empress ordered to be recorded. In contrast, the epitaph from her tomb states that she died in childbirth. After Wu Zetian's death, when her father again came to the throne, she and her brother were reburied in grand tombs in the Qianling Mausoleum in 705.

Tomb

Li's tomb was discovered in 1960, and excavated from 1964. Among the Qianling Mausoleum burials, Li's is the largest belonging to a woman. It had been robbed in the past, probably soon after the burial, and items in precious materials taken, but the thieves had not bothered with the over 800 pottery tomb figures, and the extensive frescoes were untouched. The robbers had left in a hurry, leaving silver items scattered around, and the corpse of one of their number. The tomb had a flattened pyramid rising 12 metres above ground, and a long sloping entrance tunnel lined with frescoes, leading to an ante-chamber and the tomb chamber itself, 12 metres below ground level with a high domed roof. Most of the contents, including the frescoes, are now in the Shaanxi History Museum.

The frescoes depicted the four deities, ceremonial weaponry, daily life in the imperial court, and celestial bodies. The tomb also provides an example of Tang dynasty architecture, with depictions of buildings and caisson motifs. The main subject of the frescoes is women, the majority of whom are shown without make-up and wearing no jewellery. There are also several carved human figures, who seem to be ladies-in-waiting.

See also
List of unsolved deaths

Notes

References

685 births
701 deaths
8th-century executions by the Tang dynasty
Deaths_in_childbirth
Daughters of emperors
Executed Chinese women
Executed royalty
Suicides in the Tang dynasty
Tang dynasty princesses
Unsolved deaths